Ghat, a term used in the Indian subcontinent, depending on the context could refer either to a range of stepped hills with valleys (ghati in Hindi), such as the Eastern Ghats and Western Ghats; or the series of steps leading down to a body of water or wharf, such as a bathing or cremation place along the banks of a river or pond, the Ghats in Varanasi, Dhobi Ghat or the Aapravasi Ghat. Roads passing through mountain ghats are called Ghat Roads.

Etymology
The word 'ghat' has also been derived from Dravidian etymons such as the Tamil and Kannada word kaadu (காடு/ಕಾಡು; forest, side of a mountain, ridge) or Telugu katta and gattu (dam and embankment).

Types of Ghat

Mountain ghats 
The word ghati means valley. In Marathi, Hindi, Gujarati and Kannada, ghat is a term used to identify a difficult passage over a mountain. Charmadi Ghat of Karnataka is also notable. In many cases, the term is used to refer to a mountain range itself, as in the Western Ghats and Eastern Ghats. 'Ghattam' in Malayalam also refers to mountain ranges when used with the name of the ranges being addressed (e.g., paschima ghattam for Western Ghats), while the passage road would be called a 'churam'. Eastern Ghats on the east coast of India and Western Ghats on the west coast of India are the largest ghats in pensular India.

Western Ghats, also known as Sahyadri (Benevolent Mountains), is a mountain range covers an area of 140,000 km² in a stretch of 1,600 km parallel to the western coast of the Indian peninsula, traverse the States of Kerala, Tamil Nadu, Karnataka, Goa, Maharashtra and Gujarat. It is a UNESCO World Heritage Site and is one of the eight "hottest hot-spots" of biological diversity in the world. It is sometimes called the Great Escarpment of India. It is a biodiversity hotspot that contains a large proportion of the country's flora and fauna; many of which are only found here and nowhere else in the world. According to UNESCO, Western Ghats are older than Himalayan mountains. It also influences Indian monsoon weather patterns by 
intercepting the rain-laden monsoon winds that sweep in from the south-west during late summer. The range runs north to south along the western edge of the Deccan Plateau, and separates the plateau from a narrow coastal plain, called Konkan, along the Arabian Sea. A total of thirty-nine properties including national parks, wildlife sanctuaries and reserve forests were designated as world heritage sites - twenty in Kerala, ten in Karnataka, five in Tamil Nadu and four in Maharashtra. Ghati people, literally means the people of hills or ghats (valleys), is an exonym used for the marathi people specially those from the villages in Western Ghats, often in pejorative terms.

The Eastern Ghats are a discontinuous range of mountains along India's eastern coast. The Eastern Ghats run from the northern Odisha through Andhra Pradesh to Tamil Nadu in the south passing some parts of Karnataka and in the Wayanad region of Kerala. They are eroded and cut through by four major rivers of peninsular India, viz. Godavari, Mahanadi, Krishna, and Kaveri. The mountain ranges run parallel to the Bay of Bengal. The Deccan Plateau lies to the west of the range, between the Eastern Ghats and the Western Ghats. The coastal plains, including the Coromandel Coast region, lie between the Eastern Ghats and the Bay of Bengal. The Eastern Ghats are not as high as the Western Ghats. The Eastern Ghats are older than the Western Ghats, and have a complex geologic history related to the assembly and breakup of the ancient supercontinent of Rodinia and the assembly of the Gondwana supercontinent. The Eastern Ghats are made up of charnockites, granite gneiss, khondalites, metamorphic gneisses and quartzite rock formations. The structure of the Eastern Ghats includes thrusts and strike-slip faults all along its range. Limestone, bauxite and iron ore are found in the Eastern Ghats hill ranges.

River ghats 
These are bathing wharves  on a river.
The numerous significant ghats along the Ganges are the Varanasi ghats (the city of Varanasi has 88 ghats) and generically the "ghats of the Ganges". Most of these were constructed under the patronage of various Maratha rulers such as Ahilyabai Holkar (Queen of the Malwa Kingdom from 1767 to 1795) in the 18th century.

In Madhya Pradesh in central India there are further significant ghats along the Narmada River. People who live on the steps are also called ghats.

Shmashana, the cremation ghats

Ghats such as these are useful for both mundane purposes (such as cleaning) and religious rites (i.e. ritual bathing or ablutions); there are also specific "shmashana" or "cremation" ghats where bodies are cremated waterside, allowing ashes to be washed away by rivers; notable ones are Nigambodh Ghat and Raj Ghat in Delhi on the Yamuna, the latter of which was the cremation area for Mohandas Karamchand Gandhi and numerous political leaders after him, and the Manikarnika Ghat at Varanasi on the Ganges.

As place name suffix
"Ghat" and "Ghata" is also a suffix used in several place names across the subcontinent. This is an incomplete list:
 Balaghat, Madhya Pradesh, India
 Balurghat, West Bengal, India
 Batiaghata, Khulna, Bangladesh
 Charghat, Rajshahi, Bangladesh
 Chunarughat, Habiganj, Bangladesh
 Devghat, Nepal
 Gaighat, Nepal
 Ghatail, Tangail, Bangladesh
 Ghoraghat, Dinajpur, Bangladesh
 Goalandaghat, Rajbari, Bangladesh
 Golaghat, Assam, India
 Gowainghat, Sylhet, Bangladesh
 Haluaghat, Mymensingh, Bangladesh
 Kanaighat, Sylhet, Bangladesh
 Pasighat, Arunachal Pradesh, India
 Patharghata, Barguna, Bangladesh
 Saghata, Gaibandha, Bangladesh

Outside Indian subcontinent
The word is also used in some places outside the Indian subcontinent. For example, in George Town, Penang in Malaysia, the label "Ghaut" is used to identify the extensions of those streets which formerly ended in ghats before reclamation of the quayside (e.g., Church St Ghaut, in Malay Gat Lebuh Gereja, is the name of the extension of Church St beyond where the street used to descend to the water via a ghat). In both Penang and Singapore, there are areas named Dhoby Ghaut (dhobi meaning "launderer" or "laundry", depending on whether it refers to a person or a business).

Aapravasi Ghat or The Immigration Depot is a building complex located in Port Louis on the Indian Ocean island of Mauritius, the first British colony to receive indentured, or contracted, labour workforce from India. From 1849 to 1923, half a million Indian indentured labourers passed through the Immigration Depot, to be transported to plantations throughout the British Empire. The large-scale migration of the laborers left an indelible mark on the societies of many former British colonies, with Indians constituting a substantial proportion of their national populations. In Mauritius alone, 68 percent of the current total population is of Indian ancestry. The Immigration Depot has thus become an important reference point in the history and cultural identity of Mauritius.

See also
 Ghats in Varanasi
 Ghat Roads
 Surinaam Ghat
 Temple tank

References

External links

 Ghats of Varanasi, webpage at Varanasi official website.

 
Geography of India
Hindu symbols
Religious tourism in India